The 1926–27 season was the 46th season in the history of Nelson Football Club and their sixth campaign as a professional club in the Football League. Nelson ended the season with a record of 22 wins, 7 draws and 13 defeats, helping the team to a total of 51 points. The team started the campaign well—winning six of the first nine matches—and lost only three matches during the first five months of the campaign. In the 1926–27 season, Nelson recorded several large victories, including a 7–0 win over Accrington Stanley and a 7–1 defeat of Crewe Alexandra. Nelson were consistently near the top of the league table throughout the campaign, but were never able to supplant Stoke City from the top position, and a run of six consecutive losses at the end of the season saw them finish in fifth-place in the league.

In addition to the league campaign, Nelson also entered the FA Cup and reached the second round for the first time in their history, beating Stockport County in the first round before being knocked out by Ashington. Nelson used 24 different players during the season, many of whom had also played for the club during the previous campaign. Forwards Jimmy Hampson and Buchanan Sharp were the top goalscorers in the league, each scoring 23 goals, with Hampson's two strikes in the Cup giving him a total of 25. No player appeared in all 44 competitive matches; former England international George Wilson played the highest number of matches with 42 appearances. The highest attendance of the season at the club's Seedhill stadium was 12,415 for the 1–0 win over Bradford (Park Avenue) on 12 February 1927, while the lowest gate was 2,385 for the final game of the season against Tranmere Rovers.

Football League Third Division North

Key

H = Home match
A = Away match

In Result column, Nelson's score shown first
Goalscorers shown in order of first goal scored

Match results

Final league position

FA Cup

Key

H = Home match
A = Away match

In Result column, Nelson's score shown first
Goalscorers shown in order of first goal scored

Match results

Player statistics
Key to positions

CF = Centre forward
FB = Fullback
GK = Goalkeeper

HB = Half-back
IF = Inside forward
OF = Outside forward

Statistics

See also
List of Nelson F.C. seasons

References

Nelson F.C. seasons
Nelson